Javier Fernández Herranz (born 2 June 1991), known as Javi Navas, is a Spanish professional footballer who plays for Xerez Deportivo FC as a winger.

Club career
Born in Las Navas del Marqués, Province of Ávila, Navas finished his development at Real Valladolid. He made his senior debut with the reserves in the 2008–09 season, suffering relegation from Segunda División B.

Navas made his official debut with the Castile and León club's main squad on 8 September 2010, starting in a 1–0 home win against SD Huesca in the third round of the Copa del Rey. His first match in Segunda División came on 11 December of the following year when he came on as a second-half substitute in the 2–2 draw at Hércules CF. He was definitely promoted to the first team at the end of the campaign, being however deemed surplus to requirements by the same manager, Miroslav Đukić, and returning to the B side.

In September 2012, Navas agreed to a new two-year contract with Valladolid B. On 3 January of the following year, however, he left the Estadio José Zorrilla, signing for two years with CA Osasuna B in the third division.

On 7 July 2014, Navas rejoined his first senior team Valladolid B, now in the third tier of Spanish football. He continued competing in that league the following seasons, with Cultural y Deportiva Leonesa, UD San Sebastián de los Reyes, CD Izarra, Unionistas de Salamanca CF, Salamanca CF UDS and Zamora CF.

References

External links
 Unionistas official profile 
 
 
 
 

1991 births
Living people
Spanish footballers
Footballers from Castile and León
Association football wingers
Segunda División players
Segunda División B players
Tercera División players
Primera Federación players
Segunda Federación players
Real Valladolid Promesas players
Real Valladolid players
CA Osasuna B players
Getafe CF B players
Cultural Leonesa footballers
UD San Sebastián de los Reyes players
CD Izarra footballers
Unionistas de Salamanca CF players
Salamanca CF UDS players
Zamora CF footballers
Xerez Deportivo FC footballers